The 1995 Kazakhstan Top Division was the fourth season of the Top Division, now called the Kazakhstan Premier League, the highest football league competition in Kazakhstan.

Teams
The relegated teams at the end of the 1994 season were Uralets-Arma and Yassi, whilst Munaishy and Kainar were promoted in their place. Prior to the start of the season Khimik was renamed FC Tobol.

Team overview

League table

Results

Statistics

Top scorers

See also
Kazakhstan national football team 1995

References

External links
 Lyakhov.kz 1995 Season

Kazakhstan Premier League seasons
1995 in Kazakhstani football
Kazakh
Kazakh